Muelleria may refer to:
 Muelleria (alga), a genus of diatoms in the family Naviculaceae
 Muelleria (holothurian), a synonym for a genus of sea cucumbers, Actinopyga
 Muelleria (journal), a peer-reviewed scientific journal on botany published by the Royal Botanic Gardens Melbourne